The Aday-Stephenson House is a historic house located on the west side of Pine Street in Marshall, Arkansas.

Description and history 
It is a -story timber-framed structure, built in the manner of a dogtrot house, with an integral ell extending one of the piles. It has a side gable roof, and a full-width porch across the front, supported by round columns. The front elevation is symmetrically composed of two pairs of windows flanking two centrally-placed, separate single leaf doors, each leading into a pen behind. The house was built c. 1903-05 by John Aday, a developer who platted this part of Marshall for development.

The house was listed on the National Register of Historic Places on December 2, 1993.

See also
National Register of Historic Places listings in Searcy County, Arkansas

References

Houses on the National Register of Historic Places in Arkansas
Houses completed in 1903
Houses in Searcy County, Arkansas
National Register of Historic Places in Searcy County, Arkansas